Oru Varsham Oru Maasam is a 1980 Indian Malayalam-language film directed by J. Sasikumar and starring Jayabharathi, Sankaradi, Bahadoor and M. G. Soman. The film has a musical score by Raveendran.

Cast
Jayabharathi
Sankaradi
Bahadoor
M. G. Soman(double.role)
Meena

Soundtrack
The music was composed by Raveendran with lyrics by Poovachal Khader.

References

External links
 

1980 films
1980s Malayalam-language films
Films directed by J. Sasikumar